Julia Johnson (born 1982) is an English author, singer, songwriter and a founder-member of the post trip hop band Second Person.

Early life
Johnson is the daughter of writer and former politician Stanley Johnson and his second wife, Jennifer (née Kidd); she has a brother, Maximilian, and their paternal half-siblings are Boris, Rachel, Jo, and Leo Johnson.

Career
Johnson was a founder member of Second Person in 2001; the group remained active until 2011. Her first solo album, I Am Not The Night, recorded at Livingston Recording Studios and produced by Tristan Ivemy (Frank Turner, The Holloways), was released in May 2011 through the independent label Blue January. Her second solo album, Robber Bride, was released in June 2014. Her first novel for young adults, The Otherlife, was published by Andersen Press in July 2016.

Personal life
In November 2009, The Daily Telegraph reported that Johnson was engaged to film financier Calum Gray. In 2019, Australian media referred to her as having married Gray.

References

Other sources
 Second Person in The Independent (23 October 2002: p. 12)
 BBC Radio 2 Interview (The Weekender with Matthew Wright - 3 November 2005)
 Future Music interview (November 2005)

External links
 

1982 births
Living people
21st-century English women singers
21st-century English singers
Boris Johnson family